Tephritis shansiana is a species of tephritid or fruit flies in the genus Tephritis of the family Tephritidae.

Distribution
China.

References

Tephritinae
Insects described in 1940
Diptera of Asia